Masegoso is a small village in Albacete, Castile-La Mancha, Spain. It has a population of around 100.

References

Municipalities of the Province of Albacete